The Syed Mushtaq Ali Trophy is a domestic T-20 cricket championship in India, organized by the Board of Control for Cricket in India (BCCI), among the teams from the Ranji Trophy. It is named after Indian former test cricketer Syed Mushtaq Ali. The 2006-2007 inaugural season of this trophy was won by Tamil Nadu under the captaincy of Dinesh Karthik, and Rohit Sharma scored the first ever T20 century by an Indian in the T20 format, in it. 

Mumbai is the current champion and Tamil Nadu is the most successful team of the tournament, winning it thrice.

History 

The BCCI launched this premier domestic T-20 tournament with a structure in 2006-07 season, in which 27 Ranji teams divided in five Zones with the name of Inter-State T20 Championship which was renamed and relaunched as the Syed Mushtaq Ali Trophy. Rohit Sharma scored the first T20 century by an Indian Which is in the first edition of SMAT trophy while chasing a target of 140+ vs Gujarat he scored for Mumbai in the very 2nd match while he scored 40+ notout in first match. The winners and runners-up of each Zone qualify for the knockout stage.
In the 2012-13 season, the knockout stage was replaced with a Super League where Zonal winners and runners-up are divided into two groups and the winner of each group played the final. In 2015-16 season, the teams didn't compete on Zonal basis, and were drawn into four groups, unlike the previous seasons. In the 2016-17 season, Combined Zonal teams played the super league instead of Zonal winners. 
In June 2016, the BCCI announced that the championship would be scrapped and replaced with a zonal-based competition. The very next season, the BCCI reverted to include all the domestic teams. 

After 9 new teams were included into the domestic structure in the 2018-19 season, the zonal system was abolished and teams are drawn into five groups with group winners and runners up qualifying for the Super League. The 10 teams are divided into two groups and the Super League group winners play the Final.

The 2021 season of the Syed Mushtaq Ali Trophy is began on 20 October 2021, with the final to be played on 12 November 2021.

Format

The 38 teams have been divided into five Elite groups, namely A, B, C, D, E, comprising six teams each, and one Plate group with eight teams. Each team will play a total of five league matches, regardless of the number of teams in the group, with all 38 teams playing the same number of matches. A total of 6 teams from the top ranked teams in each group (5 elites and 1 plate) will make it to the knockout stage, and the 2nd ranked teams from the 5 elite groups will join to make a total of 8 teams.

Current teams 

The competition features all 38 Domestic Teams of India.

 Andhra Pradesh
 Arunachal Pradesh
 Assam
 Baroda
 Bengal
 Bihar
 Chandigarh
 Chhattisgarh

 Delhi
 Goa
 Gujarat
 Haryana
 Himachal Pradesh
 Hyderabad
 Jammu and Kashmir
 Jharkhand

 Karnataka
 Kerala
 Madhya Pradesh
 Maharashtra
 Manipur
 Meghalaya
 Mizoram
 Mumbai

 Nagaland
 Odisha
 Pondicherry
 Punjab
 Railways
 Rajasthan
 Saurashtra
 Services

 Sikkim
 Tamil Nadu
 Tripura
 Uttar Pradesh
 Uttarakhand
 Vidarbha

Winners

Tournament records

Team Records

Highest team score

Lowest team score

Highest Individual score

See also
 Deodhar Trophy
 Duleep Trophy
 Irani Cup
 Ranji Trophy
 Vijay Hazare Trophy

References

External links
 Syed Mushtaq Ali Trophy 2012-13
 Syed Mushtaq Ali Trophy on SPORT195
Syed Mushtaq Ali Trophy 2020-21 - Winner

Indian domestic cricket competitions
Professional sports leagues in India
1
Professional cricket leagues